and  in Japan are places of scenic beauty designated for protection and sustainable usage by the Minister of the Environment under the  of 1957. National Parks are designated and in principle managed by the Ministry of the Environment. Quasi-National Parks, of a slightly lesser beauty, size, diversity, or state of preservation, are recommended for ministerial designation and managed by the Prefectures under the supervision of the ministry.

History
Japan established its first  or public parks in 1873 (Asakusa Park, Asukayama Park, Fukagawa Park, Shiba Park, and Ueno Park). In 1911 local citizens petitioned that the shrines and forests of Nikkō be placed under public protection. In 1929 the National Parks Association was formed. In 1931 the first  was passed. After much study and survey, in March 1934 the first parks were established — Setonaikai, Unzen and Kirishima — with five more in December and a further four two years later. Three further parks were established under the old National Parks Law, in colonial Taiwan in 1937: the Tatun National Park (the smallest in Japan); Tsugitaka-Taroko National Park, (the largest); and Niitaka-Arisan National Park (with the highest mountain in then Japan).

Ise-Shima was the first to be created after the war, and a further seven had been added by 1955.

In 1957 the Natural Parks Law replaced the earlier National Parks Law, allowing for three categories: the National, Quasi-National, and Prefectural Natural Parks. With minor amendments this established the framework that operates today.

As of 1 April 2014, there were 31 National Parks and 56 Quasi-National Parks, with the National Parks covering 20,996 km2 (5.6% of the land area) and the Quasi-National Parks 13,592 km2 (3.6% of the land area). In addition, there were 314 Prefectural Parks covering 19,726 km2 (5.2% of the land area). On 27 March 2015, the 32nd National Park was established, Myōkō-Togakushi Renzan National Park, on 15 September 2016, the 33rd, Yanbaru National Park, and on 7 March 2017, the 34th, Amami Guntō National Park, subsuming Amami Guntō Quasi-National Park. On 25 March 2016, a further Quasi-National Park was established, Kyoto Tamba Kogen Quasi-National Park, on 27 March 2020, Chūō Alps Quasi-National Park, and, on 30 March 2021, the 58th, Akkeshi-Kiritappu-Konbumori Quasi-National Park.

Protection status
The area of each National and Quasi-National Park is divided into ordinary, special and marine park zones. Special zones are further subdivided into special protection and class I, II, and III special zones, restricting access and use for preservation purposes. The state owns only approximately half of the land in the parks.

Map of National Parks 
This map shows the locations of the national parks in Japan. Note Ogasawara National Park is not visible on the map.

List of National Parks

List of Quasi-National Parks

Hokkaidō  
Abashiri Quasi-National Park
Akkeshi-Kiritappu-Konbumori Quasi-National Park
Hidaka-sanmyaku Erimo Quasi-National Park
Niseko-Shakotan-Otaru Kaigan Quasi-National Park
Ōnuma Quasi-National Park
Shokanbetsu-Teuri-Yagishiri Quasi-National Park

Tōhoku  
Shimokita Hantō Quasi-National Park
Tsugaru Quasi-National Park
Hayachine Quasi-National Park
Kurikoma Quasi-National Park
Minami-Sanriku Kinkazan Quasi-National Park
Zaō Quasi-National Park
Oga Quasi-National Park
Chōkai Quasi-National Park

Kantō  
Suigō-Tsukuba Quasi-National Park
Minami Bōsō Quasi-National Park
Meiji no Mori Takao Quasi-National Park
Tanzawa-Ōyama Quasi-National Park

Chūbu  
Echigo Sanzan-Tadami Quasi-National Park
Myōgi-Arafune-Saku Kōgen Quasi-National Park
Sado-Yahiko-Yoneyama Quasi-National Park
Noto Hantō Quasi-National Park
Echizen-Kaga Kaigan Quasi-National Park
Yatsugatake-Chūshin Kōgen Quasi-National Park
Tenryū-Okumikawa Quasi-National Park
Chūō Alps Quasi-National Park
Ibi-Sekigahara-Yōrō Quasi-National Park
Hida-Kisogawa Quasi-National Park
Aichi Kōgen Quasi-National Park
Mikawa Wan Quasi-National Park

Kansai  
Suzuka Quasi-National Park
Wakasa Wan Quasi-National Park
Tango-Amanohashidate-Ōeyama Quasi-National Park
Biwako Quasi-National Park
Murō-Akame-Aoyama Quasi-National Park
Kongō-Ikoma-Kisen Quasi-National Park
Yamato-Aogaki Quasi-National Park
Kōya-Ryūjin Quasi-National Park
Meiji no Mori Minō Quasi-National Park
Kyoto Tamba Kogen Quasi-National Park

Chūgoku and Shikoku 
Hyōnosen-Ushiroyama-Nagisan Quasi-National Park
Hiba-Dōgo-Taishaku Quasi-National Park
Nishi-Chūgoku Sanchi Quasi-National Park
Kita Nagato Kaigan Quasi-National Park
Akiyoshidai Quasi-National Park
Tsurugisan Quasi-National Park
Muroto-Anan Kaigan Quasi-National Park
Ishizuchi Quasi-National Park

Kyūshū  
Kitakyūshū Quasi-National Park
Genkai Quasi-National Park
Yaba-Hita-Hikosan Quasi-National Park
Iki-Tsushima Quasi-National Park
Kyūshū Chūō Sanchi Quasi-National Park
Nippō Kaigan Quasi-National Park
Sobo Katamuki Quasi-National Park
Nichinan Kaigan Quasi-National Park
Okinawa Kaigan Quasi-National Park
Okinawa Senseki Quasi-National Park

See also
 Special Places of Scenic Beauty
 Places of Scenic Beauty
 National Government Parks
 Wildlife Protection Areas in Japan
 List of Ramsar sites in Japan
 Geography of Japan

References

External links
National Parks of Japan (Ministry of the Environment)

 
Japan
National parks
National parks